Luvia is a former municipality of Finland. It was merged to Eurajoki on 1 January 2017.

It was located in the province of Western Finland, part of the Satakunta region.

The dominate municipal language was Finnish.

See also 
 Säppi
 Säppi Lighthouse

References

External links 

 Municipality of Luvia – Official website 

Former municipalities of Finland
Populated places established in 1870
Eurajoki
1870 establishments in Finland